Lethrinus atlanticus, the Atlantic emperor, is a species of fish in the emperor family found in the eastern Atlantic Ocean off the coast of western Africa. In the wild, this species feeds on bottom dwelling invertebrates and grows up to 30 cm at average.

References

Lethrinidae
Fish described in 1830